Iván Etevenaux (born 20 October 1989) is an Argentine professional footballer who plays as an attacking midfielder for General Paz Juniors.

Career
In his youth career, Etevenaux had a spell with Deportivo Lasallano prior to joining Belgrano. Before making his Belgrano debut, he was loaned out to Torneo Argentino A side Juventud Antoniana. He returned to Belgrano in June 2010 and subsequently made his professional debut on 4 December in a Primera Nacional match against Defensa y Justicia, later that season he scored his first Belgrano goal in a league draw versus Chacarita Juniors. In total, he participated in fourteen matches in all competitions during the 2010–11 season, in-which Belgrano won promotion to the Argentine Primera División.

Etevenaux was loaned out to Primera B Nacional clubs twice during 2014. For the first part of the year, he joined Douglas Haig and scored five goals in twenty-one games. For the second part, he agreed to join Atlético Tucumán and went on to make ten appearances. He returned to Belgrano ahead of the 2015 Argentine Primera División campaign. In July 2017, Etevenaux joined recently relegated Primera B Nacional team Sarmiento. He made his debut for Sarmiento in the Copa Argentina on 6 September, scoring two goals against Sacachispas to send his side into the Round of 16.

In the summer of 2019, after just six appearances for Sarmiento due to injury, Etevenaux joined Italian Eccellenza Calabria club ASD Bocale Calcio. He remained for one season, before returning to his homeland in October 2020 with Torneo Regional Federal Amateur outfit General Paz Juniors.

Career statistics
.

References

External links

1989 births
Living people
Footballers from Córdoba, Argentina
Argentine footballers
Association football midfielders
Argentine expatriate footballers
Expatriate footballers in Italy
Argentine expatriate sportspeople in Italy
Torneo Argentino A players
Primera Nacional players
Argentine Primera División players
Eccellenza players
Juventud Antoniana footballers
Club Atlético Belgrano footballers
Club Atlético Douglas Haig players
Atlético Tucumán footballers
Club Atlético Sarmiento footballers
General Paz Juniors footballers
21st-century Argentine people